James Kevin Salestrom (born February 20, 1956) is a Grammy Nominated American singer/songwriter. Salestrom was the lead singer of the band Timberline from 1971 to 1977. Salestrom performed in Dolly Parton's band from 1979 to 1991. As a solo artist, he has performed in shows around the world.

Salestrom was born in Omaha, Nebraska in 1956.  He co-founded the country-folk rock band Timberline in 1971, where he was the lead singer and primary songwriter, along with his brother Chuck Salestrom, Dugg Duggan, Craig Link, and Bill Howland.  His song, "It's Too Soon to Let Our Love End", was recorded by Mary MacGregor on her album, Torn Between Two Lovers, in 1977.

In 1979, Salestrom joined Dolly Parton's band as a singer and musician, playing acoustic, electric, and high-string guitars and banjo.

He has won two Regional Emmys, three Colorado Broadcast Awards and his recording, All The Colors, was nominated for a Grammy for Outstanding Children's Album in 1997.

Discography 
Timberline - The Great Timber Rush (1977)
Limited Edition (1981)
Blue River Dreamin''' (1983)Genuine Colorado (1984)Look Through Any Window (1986)Dollywood Kids (1988)Step In Time (1990)
 Wild Jimbos with Jim Ratts and Jimmy Ibbotson (1991)Grateful (1992)A Collection (1992)
 Wild Jimbos Two with Jim Ratts and Jimmy Ibbotson (1993)The Christmas Tree (1993)The Great Adventure (1994)Colorado Collection (1995)A Collection For Children (1995)So Far So Good (1996)The Messenger (1996)All The Colors (1996)Western Winds (1997)Welcome to Garden Street (1997)The Colorado Crossroads (1998)Distant Eyes (1999)Safe Home (2001)Music From The Mountains (2003)Music From The Grand Canyon (2003)Fresh Tracks (2004)A Colorado Christmas (2004)Two Friends with Pete Huttlinger (2005)Open Spaces (2006)Beneath The Big Sky (2008)
 Music For The Heart, From The Broadmoor with Ken Miller (2008)Life's Good (2010)Nautilus (2012)Sweet Doin' Nothing (2013)
 Jim & James Salestrom | Live In Kearney (2017)Crossroads (2017)Shady Pine (2017)

 Appeared on other recordings Children of the Universe - Jim HornCountry Suite - Dave LogginsDifferent Directions - John DenverDolly In London - Dolly Parton
 Dolly, Dolly, Dolly - Dolly PartonFolks Live! - VariousHeartbreak Express - Dolly PartonRadio AAHS - Various
 The 1992 Telluride Bluegrass FestivalThe Wild West''

Honors 
 Emmy Awards 1993 Nominee
 Emmy Awards 1997 Winner
 Grammy Awards 1997 Nominee

References

External links 

1956 births
American male singer-songwriters
Living people
Musicians from Omaha, Nebraska
Singer-songwriters from Nebraska